CenterEdge Software is a software company that develops point of sale software and other specialty software products for the amusement, leisure and entertainment industries.

The company's products are used primarily in the United States but also abroad. CenterEdge's products include point of sale, group sales and bookings, birthday reservations, redemption management, online sales and bookings, ticketing, digital signage, time clock, employee scheduling, customer rewards and loyalty, and season passes. Additionally, CenterEdge interfaces with Embed International's debit card system.

CenterEdge is based in Roxboro, North Carolina in the United States. Its offices are located in Palace Pointe, a local family entertainment center, which serves as its beta testing site. Its customers include the trampoline park franchise Sky Zone, the National Museum of Crime & Punishment, the Daytona Lagoon waterpark and family entertainment center, the Andretti Thrill Park family entertainment and kart racing center, and iPlay America.

Products 

CenterEdge's main product is called Advantage, which has four primary components:
 Point of Sale, the primary component
 Groups, for scheduling and managing group events and bookings
 Birthday Reservations, for scheduling and managing birthday parties
 Redemption Management, for managing redemption centers

It also offers online sales and bookings, and interfaces for Embed International and QuickBooks.

Industry associations 

CenterEdge is a member of the following industry associations: 
 International Association of Amusement Parks and Attractions
 National Association of Family Entertainment Centers
 Roller Skating Association
 Association of Zoos and Aquariums
 International Laser Tag Association

References

External links 
 Official Website

Point of sale companies
Companies based in North Carolina
2004 establishments in North Carolina